Ciliocincta is a genus of worms belonging to the family Rhopaluridae.

Species:

Ciliocincta akkeshiensis 
Ciliocincta julini 
Ciliocincta sabellariae

References

Orthonectida